Prime~S.E.S. The Best is the second Japanese studio album by S.E.S., released on March 15, 2000.

Singles
The album's first single was "T.O.P. -Twinkling of Paradise-", featuring a rap by Verbal of M-Flo.  It was S.E.S.' fourth full Japanese single and sold approximately 5,000 copies.  It was released on October 27, 1999.

Track listing

 T.O.P. -Twinkling Of Paradise- feat. Verbal
 T.O.P. -Twinkling Of Paradise- (Masters Funk Remix) feat. Verbal
 Life -This is the Power-

"Sign Of Love"/"Miracle" was the first single from the album and the group's fifth Japanese single. Released on December 8, 1999, it sold approximately 5,000 copies.

Track listing

 Sign Of Love
 Miracle
 Sign Of Love (DJ Favouret-Club Mix)
 Sign Of Love (Instrumental)

Album track listing
 Twilight Zone (Japanese Ver.) (3:48)
 Shy Boy (Japanese Ver.) (3:41)
 I’ve Been Waiting For You (Japanese Ver.) (3:40)
 (愛)という名の誇り (In The Name of Love) (5:21)
 夢をかさねて (Just In Love) (4:49)
 T.O.P. -Twinkling Of Paradise- (Feat. Verbal of m-flo) (4:41)
 Unh~HAPPY DAY (5:15)
 めぐりあう世界 (Fate World) (5:01)
 Shining Star (4:24)
 Sign Of Love (4:51)
 月の果てまで (Beyond The Moon (4:32)

External links 
  S.E.S.' Official Site
  SM Entertainment's Official Site

S.E.S. (group) albums
2000 greatest hits albums